Susumu Shingū is a kinetic sculptor from Japan. His nature-inspired works are constructed of highly engineered materials, commonly steel and Teflon.

Biography

Early Years 
Susumu Shingū, was born in Osaka, Japan, in 1937. He matriculated at the University of Fine Arts in Tokyo in 1956, with a concentration in oil painting. A bursary from the Italian government followed, allowing him to travel to Italy where his intention was to study figurative painting. He attended the Accademia di Belle Arti di Roma from 1960 to 1962. By his own account, Shingū's interest in sculpture developed as his interest in abstraction was expanding. He hung a painting outside to record it photographically: the wind interfered. He became fascinated by the potential for three-dimensional movement. "The work that followed relied on natural forces to make it move or make sound, and he began using more sophisticated materials for outdoor works," as traditional art materials were either too heavy to supply graceful natural movement or too quickly degraded under outdoor conditions.

Osaka Ship Building Company 
Still in Italy, a chance meeting with Kageki Minami, the president of Osaka Ship Building Company, led to Shingū's return to Japan, where Minami allowed him a studio in his shipyard and access to the talents of company engineers. With this support, Shingū produced “Path of Wind,” a 20-meter-tall sculpture that was his first large-scale commissioned piece. He began to produce work incorporating elements from his study of the Japanese folk arts: wind chimes and traditional carp banners.

Expo '70 in Tokyo was a major event on the arts scene in Japan. Shingū was one of eight Japanese sculptors chosen to represent the nation. The organizers commissioned a large piece from Shingu for the central plaza.

He spent a year at Harvard University as a Visiting Artist at Harvard's Carpenter Center for the Visual and Environmental Studies, 1971 to 1972.

Traveling Exhibitions 
Shingū, a prolific artist, has participated in numerous group and solo exhibitions internationally. Additionally, he has collaborated in theatre projects (including variations on tradition Japanese Nô performance) and published a number of children's books. His work has been honored with many awards, including the Outdoor Sculpture Prize of Nagano City and the Japan Grand Prix of Art.

Wind Museum 
The 3,000-sq.-meter Susumu Shingū Wind Museum is an open-air sculpture garden in Sanda, Japan, established in 2012.

Exhibitions & Traveling Shows 
 Windcircus, (1987) Bremen, Germany; Barcelona, Spain; Florence, Italy; Lahti, Finland; New York City, Fall River, Boston, Chicago, and Los Angeles, United States; Nagano, Japan 
Cosmos (2018), Galerie Jeanne Bucher Jaeger, Paris, France
 Wind Caravan (2019–20) Japan

Gallery

Quotations 
"My works are ways of translating the messages of nature into visible movements"

References

External links 
 Susumu Shingu Wind Museum

1937 births
Living people
20th-century Japanese sculptors
21st-century Japanese artists
People from Osaka